Bárbula is a locality in Naguanagua Municipality, Venezuela. It has the main campus of the University of Carabobo. The facilities include a palmetum, the Parque Universitario Palmetum.

Battle of Bárbula
At the beginning of the 19th century Bárbula was a farm or hacienda, which was visited by Alexander von Humboldt.

The background was that the United Provinces of New Granada (Colombia) granted Simon Bolivar permission to lead a force to free Venezuela.
The battle is mentioned in the National Anthem of Colombia in an allusion to the heroic death of Atanasio Girardot.
Del Orinoco el cauce
se colma de despojos;
de sangre y llanto un río
se mira allí correr.
En Bárbula no saben
las almas ni los ojos,
si admiración o espanto
sentir o padecer.

Bárbula Tunnel
Bárbula Tunnel is part of a railway under construction between Puerto Cabello and La Encrucijada (Estado Aragua). The project to build the line of approx. 108 km is managed by Instituto de Ferrocarriles del Estado. 
The tunnel has a length of 7.8 km (4.8 mi), which makes it the longest in South America.

References

Populated places in Carabobo